Merzifonlu or Merzifoni is a prefix or epithet for persons from the Merzifon district of Turkey. Notable people with the epithet include:
 Merzifonlu Kara Mustafa Pasha (1634–1683), Ottoman grand vizier
 Merzifonlu Hacı Çalık Ali Pasha (died 1698), Ottoman grand vizier
 Merzifonlu Gül Baba (died 1541), Ottoman Bektashi poet

Epithets
 
Turkish words and phrases